The 1974 U.S. National Indoor Tennis Championships was a men's tennis tournament held at the Wicomico Youth and Civic Center in Salisbury, Maryland in the United States. The event was part of the 1974 USLTA Indoor Circuit. The tournament was held from February 18 through February 24, 1974, and played on indoor carpet courts. Second-seeded Jimmy Connors won the singles title and earned $9,000 first-prize money.

Finals

Singles
 Jimmy Connors defeated  Frew McMillan 6–4, 7–5, 6–3
 It was Connor's 5th singles title of the year, and the 22nd of his career.

Doubles
 Jimmy Connors /  Frew McMillan defeated  Byron Bertram /  Andrew Pattison 7–5, 6–2

References

External links
 ITF tournament edition details

Tennis tournaments in the United States
Salisbury, Maryland
U.S. National Indoor Tennis Championships
U.S. National Indoor Tennis Championships
U.S. National Indoor Tennis Championships